The 2015 Athletics Kenya World Championship Trials the athletics meeting held by Athletics Kenya to select the representatives to the 2015 World Championships in Athletics in Beijing, China  The meet was held July 31 to August 1, 2015 in Nyayo National Stadium in Nairobi, Kenya.  Nairobi is at high altitude in athletics terms.

Men's Results
Key:
.

Track

Field

Women's results
Key:
.

Track

References

2015 in athletics (track and field)
2015 in African sport
Athletics Kenya World Championship Trials
July 2015 events in Africa
July 2015 sports events in Africa
August 2015 sports events in Africa
Kenyan Athletics Championships